The TB 114 class was a class of four 160-foot torpedo boats built for the British Royal Navy in 1903–1905 by the shipbuilder J. Samuel White. All four ships served in local defence flotillas during the First World War, with one of the ships being sunk in 1918. The remaining three ships were withdrawn from use after the end of the war, with the last of the class sold for scrap in 1921.

Construction and design

In the 1902–1903 shipbuilding programme, the British Admiralty placed an order with the shipbuilder J. Samuel White for four '160-foot' torpedo boats, as a follow-on to four '160-foot' torpedo boats ordered from the rival shipyard Thornycroft under the 1899–1900 and 1900–1901 shipbuilding programmes (the ) and five more ships of similar design ordered from Thornycroft under the 1901–1902 shipbuilding programme (the ). These '160-foot' torpedo boats allowed the replacement of worn out older torpedo boats. The 1902–1903 torpedo boats (the TB 114 class) were the last '160-foot' torpedo boats built for the Royal Navy. Torpedo-boat construction did not resume until the 1905–1906 programme, when orders were placed for twelve of a new class of "Coastal destroyers" which were subsequently re-classed as torpedo boats. These twelve (and a further twenty-four which followed them) were of similar size to the '160-foot' boats, but were turbine-powered, with the lighter machinery allowing a heavier armament to be carried.
 
The 1902–1903 torpedo boats were slightly larger than those built by Thornycroft, but were still of basically similar design. The ship had a turtleback forecastle and had two funnels.

The ships were fitted with three 18-inch (450 mm) torpedo tubes. Two single tubes were mounted on the beam of the ship, just aft of the forecastle, where they could fire nearly directly ahead, with the third tube on the ship's centreline further aft. Three 3-pounder (47 mm) guns, two forward and one aft, completed the ship's armament.

Service
In November 1911, TB 115 was a tender to the torpedo school HMS Actaeon. Three of the ships (TB 114, TB 115 and TB 117) were part of The Nore torpedo boat flotilla and manned with nucleus crews in February 1913, with TB 116 part of the Portsmouth Flotilla.

The four ships remained part of the Nore and Portsmouth flotillas in July 1914, on the eve of the outbreak of the First World War. During the First World War they served with local defence flotillas at the Nore and Portsmouth, being limited to local defence duties owing to their small size and limited endurance. TB 116 opened fire on the submarine and attempted to ram, but the submarine dived to safety. TB 117 was sunk in a collision with a merchant ship, the SS Kamouraska, in the English Channel on 10 June 1917. The three remaining ships of the class remained in service with local defence flotillas in December 1918, but by January 1919, only TB 116 was in service, as a tender at Portsmouth. TB 114 and TB 115 were sold for scrap in 1919, with TB 116, which had been used for cadet training, being sold in 1921.

Ships

See also
List of torpedo boat classes of the Royal Navy

References

Ship classes of the Royal Navy
Torpedo boats of the Royal Navy